The 2011 Baltimore Grand Prix was held at Baltimore Street Circuit on September 3, 2011. It was the seventh round of the 2011 American Le Mans Series season.

Qualifying

Qualifying Result
Pole position winners in each class are marked in bold.

Race

Race result
Class winners in bold.  Cars failing to complete 70% of their class winner's distance are marked as Not Classified (NC).

References

Baltimore
Baltimore Grand Prix
2010s in Baltimore
Baltimore Grand Prix ALMS